Harry Willsie (20 December 1928 – 3 January 2003) was a Canadian sports shooter. He competed at the 1964, 1968 and 1976 Summer Olympics.

References

1928 births
2003 deaths
Canadian male sport shooters
Olympic shooters of Canada
Shooters at the 1964 Summer Olympics
Shooters at the 1968 Summer Olympics
Shooters at the 1976 Summer Olympics
People from Randolph County, Missouri
Sportspeople from Missouri
Shooters at the 1974 British Commonwealth Games
Commonwealth Games medallists in shooting
Commonwealth Games gold medallists for Canada
American emigrants to Canada
20th-century Canadian people
Medallists at the 1974 British Commonwealth Games